During the 1996–97 English football season, Fulham F.C. competed in the Division Three. It was their third season in the league's fourth tier, and they finished the season with their first promotion in 15 years.

Season summary
In his first full season as manager, Micky Adams guided them to automatic promotion and as a result won the Division Three Manager of the Season award. They finished level on points at the top of the division with Wigan Athletic.

Fulham's previous promotion had been in 1982, when they were promoted from the old Third Division.

It was the first of three promotions in five seasons for the club, which saw them reach the FA Premier League in 2001 and end a 34-year exile from the top division of English football.

Final league table

Results
Fulham's score comes first

Legend

Football League Third Division

FA Cup

League Cup

Football League Trophy

Squad

References

Fulham F.C. seasons
Fulham